The Mizieș is a right tributary of the river Crișul Negru in Romania. It discharges into the Crișul Negru near Beiuș.

References

Rivers of Romania
Rivers of Bihor County